Pomacea columellaris is a South American species of freshwater snail in the apple snail family, Ampullariidae.

Taxonomy 
Pomacea columellaris was originally described as Ampullaria columellaris by Augustus Addison Gould in 1848, based on a holotype shell collected during the United States Exploring Expedition from 1838-1842. They were named for their notable columella, comparable to those of Helix land snails. In 1904, Dall proposed a section or subgenus of Ampullaria (later treated as synonymous with Pomacea) called Limnopomus, with A. columellaris as the type species. After 1991, Limnopomus was also considered synonymous with Pomacea.

Shell description 
The species has a heavy, oval shell with a sharp spire. Its operculum is corneous and able to retract inside the shell's aperture. They lack an umbilicus and are often yellow in color.

Distribution 
P. columellaris is found in rivers in the highlands of Venezuela, Colombia, Ecuador (Pastaza Province), and Peru.

References 

 Simone, L. R. L. (2006). Land and Freshwater Molluscs of Brazil. Editora Grafíca Bernardi, FAPESP. São Paulo, 390 pp

External links
 Gould, A.A. (1848). [Shells collected by the United States Exploring Expedition under the command of Charles Wilkes.. Proceedings of the Boston Society of Natural History. 3: 73–75]
 Philippi, R. A. (1851-1852). Die Gattung Ampullaria. In Abbildungen nach der Natur mit Beschreibungen. In: Schuberth, G. H.; Wagner, J. A., Eds. Systematisches Conchylien-Cabinet von Martini und Chemnitz. Neu herausgegeben und vervollständigt. Ersten Bandes zwanzigste Abtheilung. 1-74, pls A, 1-21. Nürnberg: Bauer & Raspe

columellaris
Gastropods described in 1848
Freshwater snails
Molluscs of South America
Invertebrates of Ecuador
Invertebrates of Peru
Molluscs of Venezuela
Invertebrates of Colombia